Le Bouquet Africain is an audiovisual offer with 27 TV channels launched by Thema on the French market in September 2008 in a preview with the French telecommunications operator Neuf. As of 2009 some cable and ADSL operators have also offered this bouquet to their subscribers. It is mainly intended in particular for the population originating in sub-Saharan Africa.

Distribution
The offer is available in France, Belgium and Canada via the following operators:

France
Bouygues Telecom
Free
Numericable
Orange
SFR TV

Belgium
SFR TV

Canada
Bell Fibe TV

Programming

Pan-African
A+
Africable
Gospel Music TV
Maïsha TV
Nollywood TV
Trace Africa

Benin
Golfe TV Africa
ORTB

Burkina Faso
Radio Télévision du Burkina

Cameroon
Cameroon Radio Television
Canal 2 International
Equinox TV
STV2

Congo Brazzaville
Télé Congo

Côte d'Ivoire
La Première (RTI)

Democratic Republic of the Congo
Antenne A
b-one Télévision
RTNC

Gabon
Gabon 24
Gabon Télévision

Guinea
Radio Télévision Guinéenne

Mali
ORTM

Senegal
2sTV
RTS 1
SEN TV
TFM

Togo
Télévision Togolaise

References

External links
 

Mass media in France